Shake the Spirit is the second studio album by American singer, songwriter  Elle King, released on October 19, 2018 by RCA Records. It was recorded in Denton, Texas.

Commercially, Shake the Spirit peaked at No. 9 on the US Top Rock Albums (Billboard) and No. 6 on the US Top Alternative Albums (Billboard).

Upon the album's release it received critical acclaim from music critics. Many stated since King's global success with "Ex's and Oh's" it proves that she has much more to offer, stating it is infused with "divorce, self-doubt, medicinal drinking, and PTSD," all of which King suffered in her personal life after being in the spotlight.

Music
Variety described Shake the Spirit as "confessional rock and roll". Billboard said it is "a cathartic, rough-edged diary entry of a project that couldn't be more personal".

Critical reception

Chris Willman of Variety called the album "a first-rate second album that deals frankly with a rough year or two the singer has had since "Ex's and Oh's" took her big-time. It's infused with divorce, self-doubt, medicinal drinking, PTSD and, well, more divorce." Eric R. Danton of Paste said the album "plays like a kind of musical revue, with nods at muscular rock, old-school spy movie songs, vintage soul, '60s girl groups and tunes that blend elements of all four", but that they do not "hang together as a group, which gives Shake the Spirit a scattershot feel. It's an Elle King album, to be sure—her voice is what stitches these songs together, though what is probably supposed to be evidence of her range often feels like she's trying on musical costumes. The result is a lack of cohesion that turns Shake the Spirit into a series of genre exercises."

Track listing

Personnel
Adapted credits from the liner notes of Shake the Spirit.

Vocals
Lead vocals – Elle King, Cameron Neal
Background vocals – Denton Choir, Paul DeVincenzo, Jesse Gibbon, Joey McClellan, Cameron Neal, Cherish Robinson, Dave Scalia
Gang vocals – Tim Pagnotta, Brian Phillips

Instruments

Alto, Tenor, Flute and Clarinet – David Monsch
Bari Sax – Mike Morisson
Bass – Paul DeVincenzo, Elle King, Greg Kurstin, Brian Phillips, Paul Unger
Cellos – Shawna Hamilton, Buffi Jacobs
Drums and percussion – Elliott Jacobson, Elle King, Greg Kurstin, Dave Scalia
Guitars – Elle King, Greg Kurstin, Rebecca Lovell, Joey McClellan, Cameron Neal, Tim Pagnotta
Keyboards – Jesse Gibbon, Brian Phillips
Lap Steel – Elle King, Megan Lovell
Trombone – David J. Piere
Violins – Catherine Price Allain, Anne Bonnett, Arthur Busby, Ordabek Duissen, Steven Li, Amy Faires Lin, Swang Lin (Concertmaster), Florence Wang

Production

A&R – Keith Naftaly
Engineering – Julian Burg, Paul DeVincenzo, Greg Kurstin, Alex Pasco, Brian Phillips
Mastering – Ryan Smith, Stephen Marcussen ("Baby Outlaw")
Mixing – Neal Avron, Michael H. Brauer, Tony Hoffer, Dave Rowland, Mark "Spike" Stent
Mixing assistant – Micheal Freeman, Scott Skrzynski, Steve Vealey
Producer – Elle King, Greg Kurstin, Tim Pagnotta, Matt Pence

Imagery
Art director – Meghan Foley
Creative producer – Tyler Morgan
Hair – Marwa Basihr
Makeup – Michelle Clark
Photography – Dennis Leupold
Stylists – Dani + Emma

Charts

References

2018 albums
Elle King albums
RCA Records albums
Albums produced by Greg Kurstin